Bayırköy is a village in the İkizdere District, Rize Province, in Black Sea Region of Turkey. Its population is 169 (2021).

History 
Most villagers are ethnically Laz.

Geography

References

Villages in İkizdere District
Laz settlements in Turkey